Gabara  is a genus of moths in the family Erebidae. The genus was erected by Francis Walker in 1866.

Taxonomy
The genus was previously classified in the subfamily Calpinae of the family Noctuidae. The genus includes the following species:
 Gabara distema Grote, 1880
 Gabara gigantea J. B. Smith, 1905
 Gabara obscura Grote, 1883
 Gabara pulverosalis Walker, 1866
 Gabara stygialis J. B. Smith, 1903 (syn.: Gabara infumata Hampson, 1926)
 Gabara subnivosella Walker, 1866

References

Scolecocampinae
Glossata genera